First Congregational Church  is located in Burlington, Iowa, United States. It was listed on the National Register of Historic Places in 1976. The church is also a contributing property in the Heritage Hill Historic District.

History
The congregation was organized in 1838. The Rev. Horace Hutchinson was the first pastor and the congregation met in the home of James G. Edwards who was the publisher of the Burlington Hawk-Eye. He was succeeded by the Rev. William Salter who served here for 64 years (1846-1910). The congregation was involved in social ministry, civil rights, public education, and free libraries. Under Salter's leadership, it was a champion of the abolition of slavery and was a stop on the Underground Railroad.

When the General Council of Congregational Christian Churches merged with the Evangelical and Reformed Church and formed the United Church of Christ, First Congregational Church joined with about 200 other Congregational Christian churches in choosing not to join the merger, mainly because of the issue of congregational polity. It became a part of the National Association of Congregational Christian Churches, which was created in 1955. The church is a member of the National Association, the Iowa-Nebraska Association of Congregational Churches and the Burlington Area Council of Churches.

Architecture
The church building was constructed from 1867 to 1870. It is a Gothic Revival built of dressed dolomite. It is dominated by a tall, square, crenelated corner tower. It rises in three stages, which are separated by belt courses.

References

External links
Church Web Site

Religious organizations established in 1838
Gothic Revival church buildings in Iowa
Churches in Burlington, Iowa
Congregational churches in Iowa
National Register of Historic Places in Des Moines County, Iowa
Churches on the National Register of Historic Places in Iowa
Churches on the Underground Railroad
Underground Railroad in Iowa
African-American history of Iowa
1838 establishments in Iowa Territory
Individually listed contributing properties to historic districts on the National Register in Iowa